Every Man a Tiger (1999) is Tom Clancy's second book in his "Study in Command" series. It is partially a biography of General Chuck Horner (CENTAF during Operation Desert Storm and Desert Shield), but mostly it is a study of the command decisions, preparations, and execution of air war of Operation Desert Storm.

The book is mostly written by Tom Clancy with sections where he uses General Horner's own words.

External links
Presentation by Clancy and Horner to the National Press Club on Every Man a Tiger, May 18, 1999, C-SPAN

Books by Tom Clancy
1999 non-fiction books
G. P. Putnam's Sons books
Gulf War books
Non-fiction books about the United States Air Force